Patrick Cummins, aka Cummings (fl. 1820s) was an Irish piper and tutor.

Cummins was a native of or near Athenry, where his family had kept a 'college' for pipers for generations. He himself taught many pipers, such as Owen Cunnigam, Michael Kenny (piper), Patsy Mullin, Michael Touhey (grandfather of Patsy Touhey), and his own son, Professor John Cummings (1828-after 1913).

References
 Irish pipers of distinction, Chapter XXII, Irish Minstrels and Musicians, by Capt. Francis O'Neill, Chicago, 1913.

External links
 http://billhaneman.ie/IMM/IMM-XXII.html

Musicians from County Galway
Irish uilleann pipers
18th-century Irish musicians
19th-century Irish musicians